is a Japanese horror manga series by Shinichi Koga. It has been adapted into a live action film series with six films, two Japanese television drama series and an original video animation.

Plot
According to her fellow students, Misa is a star student and an idol of the classroom. However, she is also a young witch who goes from school to school using black magic in order to enact chaotic and brutal justice. Along the way, her strange past is revealed.

Media

Manga 
The manga was published by Akita Shoten, with serialization in Weekly Shōnen Champion from September 1, 1975 to April 9, 1979 and compiled into 19 volumes published from March 1976 to July 1979.

After the end of the original series, a sequel, Majo Kuroi Misa was serialized in Weekly Shōnen Champion in 1982, and was compiled in 2 volumes.. A third series, Eko Eko Azarak II, was serialized in Weekly Shōnen Champion and Suspiria, starting in 1993 and compiled into 6 volumes. Both these series were written and drawn by the series original creator, Shinichi Koga. In 2020, two years after the death of Shinichi Koga, a remake series by J-ta Yamada, titled Eko Eko Azarak: Reborn began serialization in Champion Red. The series will end serialization on March 17, 2023.

Films 
Eko Eko Azarak: Wizard of Darkness (1995)
Eko Eko Azarak II: Birth of the Wizard (1996)
Eko Eko Azarak III: Misa The Dark Angel (1998)
Eko Eko Azarak IV: Awakening (2001)
Eko Eko Azarak: R-page (2006)
Eko Eko Azarak: B-page (2006)
"Eko Eko Azarak: Kuroi Misa First Episode" (2011)

Dramas 
A live-action school horror drama series was broadcast from February 1 to May 31, 1997 on TV Tokyo, consisting of 26 episodes. In 2004, another horror drama series named  was broadcast from January 6 to March 30, also on TV Tokyo, with 13 episodes. The cast included  as Misa Kuroi and also Yoko Mitsuya,  and Aiko Kayō.

Anime 
An anime adaptation by Toei Animation was released as an OVA on January 30, 2007.

Reception

References

External links
 Drama official site
 Anime OVA official site

1975 manga
1979 comics endings
1996 films
1997 Japanese television series debuts
1997 Japanese television series endings
1998 films
1990s Japanese films
2004 Japanese television series debuts
2004 Japanese television series endings
2006 films
2007 anime OVAs
2000s Japanese films
2000s Japanese-language films
Akita Shoten manga
Comics about magic
Fiction about curses
Fiction about sacrifices
Films about witchcraft
Films directed by Shimako Satō
Horror anime and manga
Japanese horror fiction television series
Japanese horror films
Japanese LGBT-related films
Japanese television dramas based on manga
LGBT-related horror films
Live-action films based on manga
Manga adapted into films
Shōnen manga
Toei Animation original video animation
TV Tokyo original programming
Witchcraft in anime and manga
Witchcraft in television